HMS Polyanthus was a  of the Royal Navy. She was launched on 30 November 1940 from Leith Docks on the Firth of Forth, at an estimated cost of £55,000. Polyanthus was sunk by the  using new German weapons technology on 20 September 1943 about 1,000 miles southwest of Reykjavík during convoy escort duty in the Battle of the North Atlantic.

Background

Flower-class corvettes like Polyanthus serving with the Royal Navy during World War II were different from earlier and more traditional sail-driven corvettes.  The "corvette" designation was created by the French in the 19th century as a class of small warships; the Royal Navy borrowed the term for a period but discontinued its use in 1877. During the hurried preparations for war in the late 1930s, Winston Churchill reactivated the corvette class, needing a name for smaller ships used in an escort capacity, in this case based on a whaling ship design. The generic name "flower" was used to designate the class of these ships, which – in the Royal Navy – were named after flowering plants.

War duty and sinking
Although designed for quick and cheap construction, Polyanthus and ships like her in the Flower class were operative in convoy escort during the Battle of the North Atlantic.
The primary mission of protection against U-boats saw Polyanthus active in several transatlantic convoys in the early part of the war.  By late 1943, the Kriegsmarine were using an acoustic homing torpedo - known to the Allies as a GNAT - which they hoped would reverse the changing tide of war, favouring the Allies in the Atlantic.

Whilst under the command of Lieutenant John Gordon Aitken RNR, Polyanthus was sunk by U-952 using a GNAT before any rescue could be effected. At least 7 officers and 77 crew were lost with Polyanthus among them Lt Graham Shepard. The only known survivor drowned within days at the hands of another U-boat attack on the ship that rescued him, .

See also
Wolf pack

Notes and references
Notes

Bibliography

External links
 
  "The Last Hurrah of the Wolf Packs" an article reprinted from Canadian Forces Internal News Sources (September 1993)
 Able seaman Leslie Hockley, a crewman on HMS Polyanthus

 

1940 ships
Flower-class corvettes of the Royal Navy
Ships built in Leith
Maritime incidents in September 1943
Ships sunk by German submarines in World War II
World War II shipwrecks in the Atlantic Ocean
Ships lost with all hands